One third of Watford Borough Council in Hertfordshire, England is elected each year, followed by one year when there is an election to Hertfordshire County Council instead.

Political control

Directly elected mayor
The directly-elected mayors of Watford since 2002 have been:

Council elections
1973 Watford Borough Council election
1976 Watford Borough Council election (New ward boundaries)
1979 Watford Borough Council election
1980 Watford Borough Council election
1982 Watford Borough Council election
1983 Watford Borough Council election
1984 Watford Borough Council election
1986 Watford Borough Council election
1987 Watford Borough Council election
1988 Watford Borough Council election
1990 Watford Borough Council election
1991 Watford Borough Council election
1992 Watford Borough Council election
1994 Watford Borough Council election
1995 Watford Borough Council election
1996 Watford Borough Council election
1998 Watford Borough Council election
1999 Watford Borough Council election (New ward boundaries)
2000 Watford Borough Council election
2002 Watford Borough Council election
2003 Watford Borough Council election
2004 Watford Borough Council election
2006 Watford Borough Council election
2007 Watford Borough Council election
2008 Watford Borough Council election
2010 Watford Borough Council election
2011 Watford Borough Council election
2012 Watford Borough Council election
2014 Watford Borough Council election
2015 Watford Borough Council election
2016 Watford Borough Council election (New ward boundaries)
2018 Watford Borough Council election
2019 Watford Borough Council election
2021 Watford Borough Council election
2022 Watford Borough Council election

By-election results

References

 Watford election results
 By-election results

External links
Watford Borough Council

 
Politics of Watford
Council elections in Hertfordshire
District council elections in England